Jonathan Emmett (born 10 December 1965) is a British children's author and pop-up book designer. He is best known for his picture books including Bringing Down the Moon, Someone Bigger and The Princess and the Pig. His books have won several awards including the Red House Children's Book Award for Pigs Might Fly and the Sheffield Children's Book Award for The Pig's Knickers.

Emmett has also written and paper-engineered several pop-up books including, Emergency Rescue and Tyrannosaurus Rocks.

Life 
Jonathan Emmett was born in Leicestershire in 1965. Best known as a picture book author, his writing is inspired and influenced by the picture books he read as a child including Where the Wild Things Are by Maurice Sendak and The Cat in the Hat by Dr. Seuss. Emmett developed his writing and illustration skills while at the University of Nottingham studying architecture.  He began writing and illustrating children's books in his spare time while working as an architect, but left the profession in 1995 to pursue a career in children's literature. He has since written over sixty children's books and his work has been translated into over 30 different languages.

He lives in Nottingham, England.

Works

Awards

Awards Won 
STEAM Children's Book Prize 2019 Best Early Years Book for How the Borks Became
Storytelling World Resource Award 2019 for Stories for Younger Listeners for Prince Ribbit
Utah Beehive Book Award 2013–2014 Picture Book Category for The Princess and the PigStorytelling World Resource Award 2014 for Stories for Younger Listeners for The Santa TrapVermont Red Clover Award 2012–2013 for The Princess and the PigBishop's Stortford Picture Book Award 2013 for Callum's Incredible Construction KitHillingdon Picture Book of the Year Award 2012 for The Princess and the Pig Rotherham Children's Book Award 2012 Picture Book category for The Pig's Knickers Sheffield Children's Book Award 2011 Picture Book category & OVERALL WINNER for The Pig's Knickers Hampshire Illustrated Book Award 2011 for The Santa TrapStockport Schools' Book Award 2011 KS1 category for MONSTERS – An Owner's Guide Perth & Kinross Word's Out Picture Book Prize 2007 for She'll Be Coming Round the Mountain.Red House Children's Book Award 2006 "Book for Younger Children" category for Pigs Might FlyNorfolk Libraries Children's Book Award 2006 "Older Picture Book" category for Pigs Might FlySouthampton's Favourite Book to Share Award 2006 for ZOOM!Kiekeboekprijs 2003 for Ik wil de maan, (the Dutch edition of Bringing Down the Moon)Southampton's Favourite Book to Share Award 2003 for A Turtle in the Toilet

Shortlisted 
Big Book Awards 2019, Children's Illustrated Category for Alphabet Street
Andersen Prize 2019, Best Popular Book category for Perché noi boffi siamo così? (the Italian edition of How the Borks Became)
Montana Treasure State Award 2019 for Prince Ribbit
Kentucky Bluegrass Award, K2 Category 2018–2019 for Prince Ribbit
Florida's Sunshine State Young Readers Award Jr. 2018–2019 for Prince RibbitHampshire Illustrated Book Award 2015 for The Clockwork DragonHillingdon Picture Book of the Year 2015 for Here Be MonstersNevada Young Readers’ Award 2015 for The Princess and the Pig Illinois Monarch Award 2015 for The Princess and the PigRound Rock Armadillo Award 2013–14 for The Princess and the PigGeorgia Children's Book Awards 2013–2014 for The Princess and the Pig Mississippi Magnolia Award 2014 for The Princess and the Pig Abiline Mockingbird Award 2012–2013 for The Princess and the Pig North Carolina Children's Book Award 2013 for The Princess and the PigMaryland Black-Eyed Susan Book Awards 2012–2013 for The Princess and the PigWashington Children's Choice Awards 2013 for The Princess and the PigCYBILS Children's and Young Adult Bloggers' Literary Award 2011 for The Princess and the Pig Richard & Judy’s Best Kids’ Book Ever (2007 Inaugural Year), Early Category, for Someone BiggerCalifornia Young Reader Medal 2006 for Ruby in Her Own TimeNottingham Children's Book Award 2005 for Someone BiggerEnglish Association's Best Children's Illustrated Book of 2004 Award for Someone BiggerPerth & Kinross Word's Out Picture Book Prize 2004 for Ruby Flew Too.

External links 
Jonathan Emmett's Web site: https://jonathanemmett.comJonathan Emmett's Blog: https://jonathanemmett.com/blogJonathan Emmett's Society of Authors Profile Page: http://www.societyofauthors.org/writer-Profile?itemID=8921Jonathan Emmett's page on Walker Books Website: http://www.walker.co.uk/contributors/Jonathan-Emmett-4443.aspxJonathan Emmett's Twitter page: https://twitter.com/JonathanEmmettJonathan Emmett's Facebook Author page: https://www.facebook.com/JonathanEmmettAuthor

References

1965 births
Living people
British children's writers
English children's writers
20th-century English writers
21st-century English writers
Alumni of the University of Nottingham
Writers from Nottingham
Pop-up book artists